Juan Antonio Díaz (born 5 July 1961) is an Argentine boxer. He competed in the men's heavyweight event at the 1988 Summer Olympics. At the 1988 Summer Olympics, he lost to Maik Heydeck of East Germany.

References

1961 births
Living people
Argentine male boxers
Olympic boxers of Argentina
Boxers at the 1988 Summer Olympics
Pan American Games medalists in boxing
Pan American Games silver medalists for Argentina
Boxers at the 1987 Pan American Games
People from Comodoro Rivadavia
Heavyweight boxers
Medalists at the 1987 Pan American Games